Jewell Christopher McNair (November 22, 1925 – May 8, 2019) was an African-American politician and businessman.

McNair was born in Fordyce, Arkansas and served in the United States Army during World War II. He received his degree in agronomy from Tuskegee University in 1949. McNair was the owner of a photography business in Birmingham, Alabama.

He served in the Alabama House of Representatives from 1973 to 1981 and was a Democrat. McNair then served on the Jefferson County  Commission from 1986 until 2001. In 2006, McNair was convicted on bribery and corruption charges and served his sentence in prison  from 2011 until 2013.

He died at his home in Birmingham, Alabama. On September 15, 1963, his daughter Denise McNair and three other children were killed in the bombing, of the 16th Street Baptist Church, in Birmingham, Alabama.

References

1925 births
2019 deaths
People from Fordyce, Arkansas
Businesspeople from Birmingham, Alabama
Politicians from Birmingham, Alabama
Military personnel from Arkansas
Tuskegee University alumni
African-American state legislators in Alabama
Democratic Party members of the Alabama House of Representatives
County commissioners in Alabama
Alabama politicians convicted of crimes
20th-century African-American people